"Lost and Found" is a song by English singer Ellie Goulding from her third studio album, Delirium (2015). It was released as a promotional single on 23 October 2015.

Composition
"Lost and Found" is a pop song, with a tempo of 138 beats per minute. Co-written by Goulding, Carl Falk, Max Martin, Laleh Pourkarim and Joakim Berg, it is a strumming, guitar-based mid-tempo song combining elements of folk and electronic music. According to Goulding, Martin originally wrote the song for Fleetwood Mac drummer Mick Fleetwood.

Critical reception
The song received mostly positive reviews. Lewis Corner of Digital Spy called the song as a "sparkling pop anthem". Rachel Brodsky of Spin wrote, "[The song] that would likely take off in any club setting", praising his chorus, saying that his beats "which never hurts". Bianca Gracie Idolator stated the song "is one of the strongest tracks [Goulding] has released thus far."

Credits and personnel
Credits adapted from the liner notes of Delirium.

Recording
 Recorded at MXM Studios (Los Angeles, California), Studio at the Palms (Las Vegas, Nevada) and Kinglet Studios (Stockholm, Sweden)
 Mixed at MixStar Studios (Virginia Beach, Virginia)
 Mastered at Sterling Sound (New York City, New York)

Personnel

 Ellie Goulding – lead vocals
 Carl Falk – production, guitars, programming, keys, backing vocals
 Max Martin – production, backing vocals
 Kristian Lundin – additional production, vocal recording, vocal production, vocal editing
 Sam Holland – engineering
 Rob Katz – engineering
 Cory Bice – engineering assistance
 Jeremy Lertola – engineering assistance
 Laleh Pourkarim – vocal recording, backing vocals
 Joakim Berg – acoustic guitars
 Martin Sköld – bass guitar
 Kristoffer Fogelmark – backing vocals
 Gustaf Thörn – backing vocals
 Serban Ghenea – mixing
 John Hanes – engineering for mix
 Tom Coyne – mastering
 Randy Merrill – mastering assistance

Charts

References

2015 songs
Ellie Goulding songs
Songs written by Carl Falk
Songs written by Ellie Goulding
Songs written by Joakim Berg
Songs written by Laleh (singer)
Songs written by Max Martin